The 1991 Czechoslovak Open, also known as the Prague Open was a men's tennis tournament played on outdoor clay courts at the I. Czech Lawn Tennis Club in Prague, Czechoslovakia that was part of the ATP World Series (Designated Week) of the 1991 ATP Tour. It was the fifth edition of the tournament and was held from 5 August until 11 August 1991. Second-seeded Karel Nováček won the singles title.

Finals

Singles

 Karel Nováček defeated  Magnus Gustafsson 7–6(7–5), 6–2
 It was Nováček's 4th singles title of the year and the 7th of his career.

Doubles

 Vojtěch Flégl /  Cyril Suk defeated  Libor Pimek /  Daniel Vacek 6–4, 6–2

References

External links
 ITF tournament edition details

Czechoslovak Open
Prague Open (1987–1999)
Czechoslovak Open